The Ven. Ian Gatford AKC (born 15 June 1940) was Archdeacon of Derby from 1993 until 2005.

After several years with Taylor Woodrow, he studied at King's College London and its postgraduate facility at St Boniface College, Warminster. He was ordained deacon in 1967 and priest in 1968.  He was successively: curate at St Mary, Clifton, Nottingham; team vicar at  Holy Trinity in the same neighbourhood; vicar of St Martin, Sherwood; and a Canon Residentiary at Derby Cathedral.

Notes

1940 births
Alumni of King's College London
Associates of King's College London
Archdeacons of Derby
Living people